Bergeron is a surname of French origin.

The name Bergeron may be derived from the Old German word berg, meaning hill or mountain.  It may also be derived from the old French berger, meaning shepherd.

Spelling variations include: Bergetron, Berger, Bergey, Bergez, Bergier, Bergeret, Bergerot, Bergereau, Bergeron, Bergerron, Bergerone, Bergeronne, Bergeronneau, Bergerat, Bergerie, Bergère, Bergière, Bergiron, Bergirone, Bergironne, le Berger, le Bergeron, de Bergeron, Leberger and many more.

First found in Burgundy, where the family was anciently seated.

Some of the first North American settlers of this name or some of its variants were: André Bergeron, who settled in Quebec from Charente-Maritime in 1666; Jacques Bergeron, who arrived in Quebec from Guyenne in 1676; Francois Bergeron, who arrived in Quebec from Poitou in 1676.  Barthélemy Bergeron d'Amboise came to Quebec in 1684 but settled in Acadia by 1695.

Following the Acadian diaspora of 1755, the Bergeron name is found today along the southeast coast of the U.S., and especially in South Louisiana.

People named Bergeron 
Bryan Bergeron, author of books in the field of computers
David Bergeron (born 1981), American football player
Élisabeth Bergeron, Canadian Venerated religious servant
Jean-François Bergeron (boxer) Canadian boxer
John J. M. Bergeron, Canadian research scientist and Rhodes Scholar
Marc-André Bergeron, French Canadian professional hockey defenceman
Matthew Bergeron (born 2000), Canadian gridiron player
Michel Bergeron, former coach of the NHL Quebec Nordiques and New York Rangers during the 1980s 
Patrice Bergeron, Canadian ice hockey centre in the National Hockey League
Peter Bergeron, professional baseball player
Stéphane Bergeron, Canadian politician
Suzanne Bergeron, Professor of Women's Studies and Social Sciences at the University of Michigan at Dearborn
Tom Bergeron (born 1955), American television personality
Tor Bergeron, Swedish meteorologist
Wayne Bergeron, professional trumpet player
William A. Bergeron, American politician

In fiction 
 "Harrison Bergeron" is a science fiction short story by Kurt Vonnegut, and the name of the principal character.